Rignac may refer to the following places in France:

 Rignac, Aveyron, a commune in the Aveyron department
 Rignac, Lot, a commune in the Lot department